Georgia–Spain relations are the bilateral and diplomatic relations between these two countries. Georgia has an embassy in Madrid. Spain has an embassy office in Tbilisi. Georgia and Spain (along with Portugal) have shared the historical name "Iberia" in their territories: Iberia (Spain and Portugal) and the Kingdom of Iberia (Georgia).

Diplomatic relations 
Spain maintains diplomatic relations with Georgia since 1992. Currently, Spain's relations with Georgia are marked by Spanish membership in the European Union (EU). Georgian Crown Prince David Bagration of Mukhrani was born in Madrid on June 24, 1976 and settled in Tbilisi in 2003.  

Georgia has had a diplomatic representation in Madrid since 2005. Both countries have relied on territorial unity respectively and cooperate successfully in different bilateral areas.

Economic relations 

Economic relations are limited, however, a growing interest of Spanish companies is detected, attracted by a considerable improvement of the climate for foreign investments. On 10 and 11 March 2014, Spain and Georgia signed two Memoranda of Understanding (MoU): MoU for Cooperation in the Economic Area and MoU the Tourism Area. 

In 2014, Spanish exports to Georgia amounted to 58.8 million euros (€78.8 M 2013), which represents a decrease of 25.4%, while imports made by Georgia from Spain have reached 81, 43 million euros (€29.32 million in 2013), which represents the largest increase in recent years with 177.7%.

Agreements 
 Agreement on cultural, educational and scientific cooperation, Signature: 11 March 1993, Effective: 12 June 1996, B.O.E.: 3 December 1996.
 Agreement to avoid double taxation and prevent tax evasion in matters of income and property taxes. Protocol, Signature: 7 June 2010, Effective: 1 July 2011, B.O.E.: 1 June 2011

Resident diplomatic missions
 Georgia has an embassy in Madrid.
 Spain has an embassy office in Tbilisi.

See also
 Foreign relations of Georgia
 Foreign relations of Spain
 Georgians in Spain
 Georgia–EU relations

References 

 
Spain
Georgia